The Simón Bolívar United World College of Agriculture was part of the United World College movement, one of eighteen such schools around the world (as of 2020).  In 2012 it was closed as a result of action taken by the Venezuelan government.

References

United World Colleges
Educational institutions established in 1986
Universities in Venezuela
Educational institutions disestablished in 2012
1986 establishments in Venezuela
2012 disestablishments in Venezuela